Jan Pieter Hogendijk (born 21 July 1955) is a Dutch mathematician and historian of science. Since 2005, he is professor of history of mathematics at the University of Utrecht.

Hogendijk became a member of the Royal Netherlands Academy of Arts and Sciences in 2010.

Hogendijk has contributed to the study of Greek mathematics and mathematics in medieval Islam; he provides a list of Sources on his website (below). 
In 2012, he was awarded the inaugural Otto Neugebauer Prize for History of Mathematics, by the European Mathematical Society, "for having illuminated how Greek mathematics was absorbed in the medieval Arabic world, how mathematics developed in medieval Islam, and how it was eventually transmitted to Europe."

A bibliography of Hogendijk's publications is included in his website.

Selected works
 
 
 
 
 1994: "B.L. van der Waerden's detective work in ancient and medieval mathematical astronomy", Nieuw Archief voor Wiskunde Vierde Serie 12(3): 145–58.
 
 2008: "The Introduction to Geometry by Qusta ibn Luqa: translation and commentary", Suhayl 8: 163–221.

References

External links
Personal website

1955 births
Living people
20th-century Dutch historians
20th-century Dutch mathematicians
21st-century Dutch mathematicians
Utrecht University alumni
Academic staff of Heidelberg University
Academic staff of Utrecht University
Members of the Royal Netherlands Academy of Arts and Sciences
People from Leeuwarden
21st-century Dutch historians